In church architecture, a retroquire (also spelled retrochoir), or back-choir, is the space behind the high altar in a church or cathedral, which sometimes separates it from the end chapel. It may contain seats for the church choir.

An example of a retroquire is within Winchester Cathedral, which was built between 1200 and 1230 to house a shrine for Saint Swithun.

See also
 Cathedral diagram
 Choir (architecture)
 Ante-choir
 Church

References

Architectural elements
Church architecture